Myra Louise Bunce (1854–1919) was an English designer and painter associated with the Arts and Crafts movement and the Pre-Raphelites.

Early life

Bunce was the elder daughter of John Thackray Bunce and Rebecca Ann Bunce, her younger sister Kate Bunce was also a painter. She was born in Birmingham and studied primarily at the Birmingham School of Art (1879–1891) although she also submitted pieces for examination to South Kensington School of Art. It was Birmingham School of Art that provided the springboard for Bunce's career as a designer; unusually it encouraged both men and women to design and make objects in a variety of materials and thus led to her interest in metalworking.

Career 

Although Bunce worked as an artist, exhibiting pieces at the Royal Academy, the Society of Women Artists and also locally in Birmingham and Walsall, she is best known for her metalworking. In particular with her sister she created two reredos; one for St Mary's Longworth in Oxfordshire and another for St Albans Church,  Birmingham. For both of these she created the hand beaten framing to hold the painted panels. The use of metal rather than moulded gesso is one of the features that distinguishes Bunce's work from that of her contemporaries. Amongst her other work is the frame that holds Kate Bunce's painting The Keepsake.

References 

1854 births
1919 deaths
19th-century English painters
20th-century English painters
19th-century English women artists
20th-century English women artists
Alumni of the Birmingham School of Art
Artists from Birmingham, West Midlands
English designers
English women painters
Metalworkers